Michael Fitzgerald Wong  Wong Man-tak (born 16 April 1965) is a Chinese-American actor based in Hong Kong.

He is fluent in English, but not in Chinese, which is reflected in many of the characters he has portrayed. His most notable film is the 1998 film Beast Cops which won a Hong Kong Film Award with Wong in the lead role. As of 2004, he has appeared in over fifty films in twenty-one years, often in very minor roles.

Early life
Michael Wong was born and raised in Troy, New York, the son of restaurateur, William Wong, and an American artist of Dutch and French descent, Connie Van Yserloo. His brothers, Russell Wong and Declan Wong, would also become actors in the Hong Kong film industry. After finishing high school, he left to go to Hong Kong to try his luck in acting. 

There were a number of significant factors against Wong's eventual success in the Hong Kong film industry including an inability to speak Cantonese Chinese, no formal training in acting and no background in martial arts. He also lacked an entry into the tightly knit in the Hong Kong film industry.

Career 
His debut was in 1985's City Hero, then in 1986 he was cast in his first major role, Legacy of Rage alongside Brandon Lee. His next significant film was Royal Warriors a.k.a. In the Line of Duty, which established his dominant image for the first part of his career as a naive but tough outsider. 

He made his English language movie debut in James Hong's The Vineyard in 1989.

Final Option, released in 1994, would make Wong a major star in the Chinese film industry. Playing the role of a police officer, Stone Wong, he established a tougher image.

In 1995, he starred alongside Jackie Chan in Thunderbolt.

In 1996, he reappeared as Stone Wong in the prequel First Option  for which he would be nominated for both an Hong Kong Film Award and a Golden Horse Award.  Also that year, Wong starred in the Canadian TV production Once A Thief directed by John Woo. 

His starring role in Beast Cops, which won a 1998 Best Film prize at the Hong Kong film awards, further consolidated his position. Also that year he acted with Shannon Lee in Enter the Eagles, and played the role of a detective in the Jean-Claude Van Damme film, Knock Off.

In 2000, Wong made his debut as a director in Miles Apart, which he also produced and starred in. He has continued to work in the Hong Kong film industry, though more often as a supporting player rather than a leading man, in productions such as Cold War, Skiptrace and Triple Threat.

In the 2002 movie New Option, he reprised the role of Stone Wong.

In 2006, Wong re-entered the music scene by performing "big band" music accompanied by a 10 piece band with the likes of "Come Fly with Me".

Personal life
Wong married Hong Kong supermodel Janet Ma in 1992 and they had two daughters, Kayla Wong and Irisa Shannon Wong, and one son, Kadin Miles Wong.

Filmography

 Flying Tiger 3 (2021)
 Flying Tiger 2 (2020)
 Triple Threat (2019)
 Flying Tiger (2018)
 Secret Treasure (2017)
 Skiptrace (2016)
 Transformers: Age of Extinction (2014)
 Z Storm (2014)
 Delete My Love (2014)
 From Vegas to Macau (2014)
 Firestorm (2013)
 SDU: Sex Duties Unit (2013)
 7 Assassins (2013)
 Cold War (2012)
 Nightfall (2012)
 Dear Enemy (亲密敌人, 2011)
 Triple Tap (2010)
 The Blood Bond (2010)
 Overheard (2009)
 Drive of Life (TVB Drama 2007)
 The Counting House (2006)
 PTU File: Death Trap (2005)
 Seven Swords (2005)
 House of Fury (2005)
 Magic Kitchen (2004)
 Women from Mars (2002)
 Partners (2002)
 The New Option (2002)
 Calmi Couri Appassionati (冷靜與熱情之間, 2001) 
 There is a Secret in my Soup (2001)
 Violent Cop (2000)
 At the Threshold of an Era (TVB Drama 1999)
 Knock Off (1998)
 Beast Cops (1998)
 Enter the Eagles (1998)
 Lost and Found (1996)
 First Option (1996)
 Thunderbolt (1995) 
 City Hunter (1993)
 Tiger Cage 3 (1991)
 The Vineyard (1989)
 In the Line of Duty 4: Witness (1989)
 Legacy of Rage (1986)
 City Hero'' (1985)

References

External links
 Hong Kong Film Michael Wong directory
 

1965 births
Living people
20th-century American male actors
21st-century American male actors
Male actors from New York (state)
American expatriates in Hong Kong
American male film actors
American male television actors
American people of Dutch descent
American people of French descent
Actors from Troy, New York
American male actors of Chinese descent
American born Hong Kong artists